Tan Tek Seng v Suruhanjaya Perkhidmatan Pendidikan & Another [1996] 1 MLJ 261 was a case heard in the Court of Appeal of Malaysia. The case concerned the allegedly wrongful dismissal of Tan Tek Seng, a senior assistant of a primary school. In ruling in his favour, the Court of Appeal held that Articles 5 and 8 of the Constitution, which protect personal liberty and equality under the law, must be read with a liberal and not literal approach. In his judgment, Gopal Sri Ram held:

Since Tan was deprived of gainful employment without a fair hearing, under this broad interpretation of Article 5, his dismissal was wrongful and unconstitutional. In 1997, the Federal Court cited the decision with approval as part of an obiter dictum in R. Rama Chandran v. The Industrial Court of Malaysia. However, when ruling directly on the interpretation of Article 5 in 2002, the Federal Court held in Pihak Berkuasa Negeri Sabah v. Sugumar Balakrishnan & Another that a generous reading of the term "personal liberty" in Article 5 was in error. The Federal Court later revisited the issue in 2009, and ruled in Lee Kwan Woh v. Public Prosecutor that constitutional rights, including those under Article 5, must be read in a generous and liberal fashion.

References

See also

Loh Wai Kong v. Government of Malaysia

Malaysian constitutional law
Malaysian case law
1996 in case law
1996 in Malaysia